Jessica Romuald Emmanuella Aby (born 16 June 1998), also known as Emmanuella Aby, is an Ivorian professional footballer who plays as a forward for Spanish Liga F club Deportivo Alavés and the Ivory Coast women's national team.

International career
Aby was part of the Ivorian squad for the 2015 FIFA Women's World Cup.

See also
List of Ivory Coast women's international footballers

References

External links
 Jessica Aby at BDFútbol
 
 Profile at FIF 

1998 births
Living people
Footballers from Abidjan
Women's association football forwards
Ivorian women's footballers
Barcelona FA players
EdF Logroño players
Segunda Federación (women) players
Ivory Coast women's international footballers
2015 FIFA Women's World Cup players
Ivorian expatriate  footballers
Ivorian expatriate sportspeople in Cyprus
Expatriate women's footballers in Cyprus
Ivorian expatriate sportspeople in Spain
Expatriate women's footballers in Spain